Myiomima is a genus of parasitic flies in the family Tachinidae. There are at least two described species in Myiomima.

Species
Myiomima appendiculata (Bigot, 1889)
Myiomima sarcophaina Brauer & von Bergenstamm, 1889

References

Dexiinae
Diptera of North America
Diptera of South America
Tachinidae genera
Taxa named by Friedrich Moritz Brauer
Taxa named by Julius von Bergenstamm